Anaikutiyur is a small village in Avudaiyanoor in Pavoorchatram. It is located in Tenkasi taluk of Tirunelveli district.
PMGSY (Pradhan Mantri Gram Sadak Yojna) is making new roads in the village.

Geography 
Anaikutiyur is situated in the foothills of Western Ghats, between Tuticorin and Quilon highway National highway. Anaikutiyur is 9 km (5.6 mi) east of Tenkasi and 45 km (28 mi) west of Tirunelveli, on the Tenkasi-Tirunelveli State Highway. The nearest popular train stations are Tenkasi and Tirunelveli.

History 
The first inhabitant of this village was Anaikannu Nadar. The entire village inhabitants are descendants of Anaikannu Nadar.

Education 
There are no educational institutions in this village but there is Punitha Arulappar Higher Secondary School in Avuudaiyanoor which takes only 5 minutes from here.

Demographics 
The population consists of Hindus and Christians. Hindus are the majority of the population.

Villages in Tirunelveli district